Hemer Provincial Park is a provincial park in British Columbia, Canada. It is located south of Nanaimo.

References

Regional District of Nanaimo
Provincial parks of British Columbia
1981 establishments in British Columbia
Protected areas established in 1981